The Hamilton–Norwood scale is used to classify the stages of male pattern baldness. The stages are described with a number from 1 to 7.

Overview
This measurement scale was first introduced by James Hamilton in the 1950s and later revised and updated by O'Tar Norwood in the 1970s. It is sometimes referred to as the Norwood–Hamilton scale or simply the Norwood scale.

The scale is regularly used by doctors to assess the severity of baldness, but it is not considered very reliable since examiners' conclusions can vary.

References

External links
Haartransplantatie
Hair Transplantation

Trichology
Medical scales
Dermatologic terminology